Marek Ryszard Mikulski (born 18 March 1981 in Lidzbark Warmiński) is a Polish Greco-Roman wrestler who competed in the 2008 Summer Olympics in Beijing and in the 2004 Summer Olympics.

At the 2008 Summer Olympics he finished 12th in the super-heavyweight competition (120 kg) in wrestling.

External links
sports-reference

1981 births
Living people
Polish male sport wrestlers
Olympic wrestlers of Poland
Wrestlers at the 2004 Summer Olympics
Wrestlers at the 2008 Summer Olympics
People from Lidzbark Warmiński
Sportspeople from Warmian-Masurian Voivodeship
20th-century Polish people
21st-century Polish people